Charles E. "Chuck" Berry (born July 1, 1950) is an American politician and lawyer from the state of Colorado.

Berry was born in Pittsburg, Kansas and grew up in Colorado Springs. He attended the University of Colorado where he earned a Bachelor of Arts magna cum laude in 1972, and later attended University of Colorado Law School where he graduated with a J.D. in 1975.

A Republican, he represented the 21st district (Colorado Springs and El Paso County, Colorado) in the Colorado House of Representatives from 1984 to 1998, and served as Speaker of the House from 1991 to 1998. Berry later served as the president of the Colorado Chamber of Commerce from 2000 until his retirement in 2021.

References

Living people
1950 births
Republican Party members of the Colorado House of Representatives
University of Colorado Law School alumni
University of Colorado alumni
Speakers of the Colorado House of Representatives
People from Colorado Springs, Colorado